Dorz (also known as Dorz Sāyeh Bān and Dorz va Sāyeh Bān) is a village in Dorz and Sayeban Rural District, in the Central District of Larestan County, Fars Province, Iran. At the 2006 census, its population was 1,357, in 269 families.

References 

Populated places in Larestan County